is a Japanese free announcer and actress. She was born in Urayasu, Chiba Prefecture, Japan.

Filmography

TV series

As a Nippon TV announcer

As a free announcer

Radio

Stage

Events

Magazines

References

External links
 

Japanese announcers
1978 births
Living people
People from Chiba Prefecture
Yokohama National University alumni